State buoni se potete is a 1983 Italian historical comedy-drama film written and directed by Luigi Magni. The film is loosely based on real life events of Saint Filippo Neri. For his musical score Angelo Branduardi won the David di Donatello for best score and the Silver Ribbon in the same category.

Cast 
Johnny Dorelli as Filippo Neri
Philippe Leroy as Ignatius of Loyola
Renzo Montagnani as Master Iacomo
Mario Adorf as Pope Sixtus V
Rodolfo Bigotti as Cirifischio  
Eurilla del Bono as Leonetta
Roberto Farris as Young Chirifischio
Federica Mastroianni as Young Leonetta
Angelo Branduardi as Spiridione
Marisa Traversi as Teresa of Ávila
Piero Vivarelli as Carlo Borromeo
Gianni Musy as The Prince
Franco Javarone as  Bargello
Tiziana Pini as Prostitute
Iris Peynado as The devil
 Giovanni Crippa as The Cardinal

References

External links

1983 films
Commedia all'italiana
Films directed by Luigi Magni
Italian biographical films
Philip Neri
Cultural depictions of Italian men
1980s Italian films